Thapa Kaji is a large social group of people of Jharra/Pure Chhettri caste (Kshatriya varna) in Nepal. Thapas of Uttrakhand And Himanchal State of India are considered as Pahari Rajput. Over a period of time, this community has spread to many parts of the world. The surname originated during the Khas Kingdom in Karnali region during middle age-it referred to a position/post of a warrior. Chhetri is considered a derivative form of the Sanskrit word Kshatriya.

"Kaji" means administrator or ruler. It was a hereditary family title awarded to some famous Nepali Kshatriya castes like Thapa, Basnyat/Basnet, Pandey, Kunwar, Bista, Khadka, etc. Majority of Thapas Chhetri speak the Nepali language as mother tongue. The Thapas Chhetris are divided into many sub-castes which are the:

 Bagale Thapa
 
 Godar Thapa
 Hriksen Thapa
 Lamichhane Thapa
 Panwar Thapa
 Suyal Thapa

Thapa Chhetri are found in different parts of current Nepal and some parts of Uttarakhand and Himachal State of India. Currently many of the Thapa Chhetri are found in Nepal, and parts of India i.e. Sikkim, Himachal, Assam as well as in Bhutan and Myanmar. The Thapa Chhetri are Kshatriya or varna like Basnyat/Basnet of Nepal.

Thapas were the major political and military figures during and after the unification of the Nepal. Bir Bhadra Thapa was a Thapa of Chhetri group and leading Bharadar during Unification of Nepal. His grandson Bhimsen Thapa became Prime Minister of Nepal and established Thapa faction in the central power. Thapas were a major power base of Nepal in the 17th century starting from Mukhtiyar Bhimsen Thapa (first prime minister of Nepal). Then it was carried out and shined by Major other historical Nepalese hero like Amar Singh Thapa, Bhakti Thapa, and Mathabarsingh Thapa. Due to the unique relation between royal family of Nepal and Thapas, they were always viewed close to royal family. The Rana who ruled Nepal for 104 years were established by Jung Bahadur Rana who rise in power by support of his maternal uncle, Mathabarsingh Thapa who was Prime Minister. Modern Chhetri Thapa are Surya Bahadur Thapa was PM of Nepal for 5 times. Army chiefs Dharmapaal Barsingh Thapa, Pyar Jung Thapa. Gagan Thapa also belongs to Chhetri family.

Notable Thapa Kaji

 

Amar Singh Thapa: Commander in chief during the Anglo-Nepal war also known as "The Living Lion" due to his bravery.
Bhakti Thapa: given the title "The bravest of the brave" by the British for his bravery as he led a small group of Gurkha soldiers at the age of 70 and fought until death.
Bhekh Bahadur Thapa, Former Foreign Affairs and Finance Minister and Diplomat
Bhimsen Thapa: First prime minister of Nepal, who ruled from Susta in west to Teesta in the east (the greatest extension of Nepal)
Bhola Thapa , Vice Chancellor of Kathmandu University
Dhan Singh Thapa, Param Vir Chakra winner 
Dharmapaal Barsingh Thapa, Ex COAS
Dharmaraj Thapa, poet with title "Janakavi Keshary"
Gagan Thapa, Prominent youth leader from Nepali Congress
Gajraj Singh Thapa, Tea Industry pioneer
Ganesh Thapa, Ex-ANFA chairman
Jharna Thapa, Nepali Actress
Kamal Thapa, Former Deputy Prime Minister of Nepal and President of Rastriya Prajatantra Party
Leeladhwaj Thapa, 1st novelist to win Madan Puraskar
Manjushree Thapa, Nepali author of English-language books
Mathabarsingh Thapa: First Prime Minister of Nepal to wear the crown, Nephew of Bhimsen Thapa, brother-in-law of King Rana Bahadur Shah, Maternal Uncle of Jung Bahadur Rana
Nain Singh Thapa, General Kaji,
Pyar Jung Thapa Ex COAS of Nepal Army
Ranabir Singh Thapa, Kaji Commander of Makawanpur at Anglo-Nepalese war
Rekha Thapa, Nepali Actress
Sher Bahadur Thapa: Victoria Cross holder was only Nepali Kshetri to receive VC
Shyam Bhakta Thapa, Ex IGP of Nepal Police
Surya Bahadur Thapa, Five times PM of Nepal, who singlehandedly operated and protected autocratic Panchayat System
Ujir Singh Thapa, Kaji Commander of Palpa at Anglo-Nepalese war

References

Sources

,

 
Surnames of Nepalese origin
Nepali-language surnames